Hatavadi is a 2006 Indian Kannada language film directed by V. Ravichandran. He stars in the lead role opposite Radhika. In addition to directing the film and acting, Ravichandran also took roles of the film's screenwriter, dialogue-writer, composer, lyricist and editor. The supporting cast features Sharan, Doddanna, Lakshman, Vinaya Prasad, Mukhyamantri Chandru and Chitra Shenoy.

Cast

 Ravichandran as Balu
 Radhika as Amisha
 Sharan
 Doddanna
 Lakshman
 K. S. L. Swamy
 Vinaya Prasad
 Padmaja Rao
 Ramesh Bhat
 Sadashiva Bramhavar
 Mandeep Roy
 Mukhyamantri Chandru
 Avinash
 Chitra Shenoy
 Bank Janardhan
 Rekha Das
 M. N. Lakshmi Devi
 Om Prakash Rao
 Damini
 B. V. Radha
 Dayanand

Production
Following the success of his 2005 film, Aham Premasmi, Ravichandran announced that he would be directing Hatavadi, though the formal announcement of the film came seven months after its launch. The film was his second directorial under the banner Sandesh Combines, after Mommaga (1997).

Soundtrack

Ravichandran composed the music for the soundtracks also writing its lyrics. The album consists of eight soundtracks.

Critical reception
Reviewing the film, The Hindu called Hatavadi a "surprise package of entertainment" and added, "Supported by brilliant photography by G.V.S. Sitaram, imposing shot composition, clever screenplay, sharp editing, insightful dialogues at places and simple narration, the film challenges the orthodox method of commercial film making." S. N. Deepak of Deccan Herald calls the film "a simple story of friendship, love, affection and hatred." and adds, "It is also about a man’s determination which makes him achieve what he wished despite obstacles, both societal and physical. There are not many surprises or turns. But Ravichandran has included all elements to please his fans." Writing for Rediff, R. G. Vijayasarathy gave the film a 2/5 rating and said, "[the film] has strong emotional content. The music also plays a major role in elevating the quality of the film." He concluded praising the performance of Radhika and writes, "... it is to Radhika's credit that she stands up to a superb performance. Her emotions are perfect and she is presented very well on screen."

References

External links

2006 films
2000s Kannada-language films
Films scored by V. Ravichandran